Faruj County is in North Khorasan province, Iran. The capital of the county is the city of Faruj. At the 2006 census, the county's population was 48,743 in 12,947 households. The following census in 2011 counted 52,364 people in 15,241 households. At the 2016 census, the county's population was 49,271 in 15,469 households.

Administrative divisions

The population history and structural changes of Faruj County's administrative divisions over three consecutive censuses are shown in the following table. The latest census shows two districts, five rural districts, and two cities.

References

 

Counties of North Khorasan Province